Clonkill GAA is a Gaelic Athletic Association club located in Clonkill, County Westmeath, Ireland.  The club is almost exclusively concerned with hurling. The club competes in Westmeath GAA competitions.

Achievements
 Westmeath Senior Hurling Championship Winners 1929, 1930, 1931, 1932, 1939, 1940, 1941, 1969, 2001, 2007, 2009, 2011, 2012, 2015 2018, 2019, 2020,
 Leinster Intermediate Club Hurling Championship Winners 2007
 All-Ireland Intermediate Club Hurling Championship Winners 2008

Notable players
Paddy Dowdall
Luke Loughlin
Brendan Murtagh
Eoin Price

References

External links
Westmeath GAA site

Gaelic games clubs in County Westmeath
Hurling clubs in County Westmeath